Cape Fear Bank, formerly named Bank of Wilmington (2006), was a Wilmington, North Carolina-based financial company engaged primarily in retail banking, mortgage banking, business finance and providing ATM and merchant processing services. The bank was established in June 1998 and Cape Fear Bank Corporation, the parent company, was formed in June 2005. The name change in October 2006 from Bank of Wilmington and Bank of Wilmington Corporation, respectively, reflected the growth of the Bank’s business in the Lower Cape Fear region of North Carolina. The Bank had full service banking offices serving New Hanover, Brunswick and Pender counties.

On April 10, 2009, regulators shut down Cape Fear Bank — the first North Carolina bank to collapse since 1993, and the 22nd U.S. bank to fail in 2009.

See also

 Late-2000s recession
 List of acquired or bankrupt banks in the late 2000s financial crisis

References

External links
FDIC Bank Closing Information for Cape Fear Bank

Bank failures in the United States
Banks based in North Carolina
Companies based in Wilmington, North Carolina
Banks established in 1998
Banks disestablished in 2009
Defunct companies based in North Carolina
1998 establishments in North Carolina
2009 disestablishments in North Carolina